Arik Braun (born 8 February 1988) is a German chess grandmaster and the world's first chessboxer of Grandmaster strength.

Chess career
He won the World Under-18 Chess Championship in 2006 and the German Chess Championship in 2009. Braun was the bronze medalist at the World Junior Chess Championship of 2008, held in Gaziantep.

References

External links

Arik Braun chess games at 365Chess.com

1988 births
Living people
Chess grandmasters
Chess boxers
German chess players
World Youth Chess Champions
German male boxers
21st-century German people